Winstanley is a suburb of Wigan in the Metropolitan Borough of Wigan, in Greater Manchester, England. Historically in Lancashire, the area had a population of 15,849, reducing at the 2011 census to 11,264.

Transport
Train services to Wigan, Manchester and Kirkby are available at the nearby Pemberton railway station. The main road in the Winstanley area is the A571 (St.Helens to Wigan). Nearby is the A49, which gives access to the M6 motorway.

Local schools
Highfield St. Matthew's CofE Primary School
Marus Bridge Primary School
St. Aidan's Catholic Primary School, Wigan
Winstanley Community Primary School
Winstanley College
Hawkley Hall High School

Adjacent places
Billinge 'Chapel End'
Billinge 'Higher End'
Orrell
Pemberton

See also

Listed buildings in Billinge and Winstanley

References

External links
Historic images of Winstanley

Areas of Wigan